Johnson Tshuma (born 30 September 1970) is a Zimbabwean professional light middle/middleweight boxer of the 1990s who won the Natal (South Africa) Middleweight Title, South African middleweight title, and Commonwealth middleweight title, and was a challenger for the South African light middleweight title against Mpush Makambi, his professional fighting weight varied from , i.e. light middleweight to , i.e. middleweight.

References

External links

1970 births
Light-middleweight boxers
Living people
Middleweight boxers
Place of birth missing (living people)
Zimbabwean male boxers